Ishmael is an extinct town in Washington County, in the U.S. state of Missouri. The GNIS classifies it as a populated place.

A post office called Ishmael was established in 1929, and remained in operation until 1953. The name "Ishmael" was assigned by postal authorities, according to local history.

References

Ghost towns in Missouri
Former populated places in Washington County, Missouri